The 1971 European Amateur Team Championship took place 24–27 June at Golf Club de Lausanne, in Lausanne, Switzerland. It was the seventh men's golf European Amateur Team Championship.

During three practice days before the tournament, the whether was warm and sunny, but on the first day of competition, play was interrupted several times due to heavy rain.

Format 
All participating teams played one qualification round of stroke-play with up to six players, counted the five best scores for each team.

The eight best teams formed flight A, in knock-out match-play over the next three days. The teams were seeded based on their positions after the stroke play. Each of the four best placed teams were drawn to play the quarter final against one of the teams in the flight placed in the next four positions. In each match between two nation teams, two 18-hole foursome games and five 18-hole single games were played. Teams were allowed to switch players during the team matches, selecting other players in to the afternoon single matches after the morning foursome matches.

The six teams placed 9–14 in the qualification stroke-play formed Flight B to play similar knock-out play and the three teams placed 15–17 formed Flight C to meet each other, to decide their final positions.

Teams 
17 nation teams contested the event. Each team consisted of a minimum of five players.

Players in the leading teams

Other participating teams

Winners 
Defending champions England won the gold medal, earning their third title, beating Scotland 5–2 in the final. Team Norway, for the first time on the podium, earned the bronze on third place, after beating  Spain 4–3 in the bronze match.

Individual leaders in the opening 18-hole stroke-play qualifying competition was Martin Kessler, Switzerland, Klaus Nierlich, Austria and Hugh Stuart, Scotland, tied first, each with a score of 1-over-par 73. There was no official award for the lowest individual scores.

Results 
Qualification round

Team standings

* Note: In the event of a tie the order was determined by the better non-counting score.

Individual leaders

 Note: There was no official award for the lowest individual score.

Flight A

Bracket

Final games

Flight B

Elimination matches

Match for 13th place

Match for 11th place

Match for 9th place

Flight C

Final standings

Sources:

See also 

 Eisenhower Trophy – biennial world amateur team golf championship for men organized by the International Golf Federation.
 European Ladies' Team Championship – European amateur team golf championship for women organised by the European Golf Association.

References

External links 
European Golf Association: Full results

European Amateur Team Championship
Golf tournaments in Switzerland
European Amateur Team Championship
European Amateur Team Championship
European Amateur Team Championship